"Wait a Minute" is a song recorded by American girl group the Pussycat Dolls for their debut studio album PCD (2005). It features a guest appearance from Timbaland, who served as the song's sole producer and co-wrote it with Keri Hilson and Craig Longmiles. Lyrically, the song showcases the artists flirting and committing to a playful give and take, highlighting the differences between the two sexes. It was released as the sixth and final single from PCD on October 16, 2006, by A&M Records and Interscope Records.

"Wait a Minute" received generally positive reviews from music critics, who complimented Timbaland's contributions and highlighted it as one of the album's standout tracks. Compared to the Pussycat Dolls' previous singles, "Wait a Minute" underperformed commercially, as it failed to attain a position within the top 100 on the UK Singles Chart. In the United States, the song reached number 28 on the Billboard Hot 100, while reaching its highest peak positions in Finland and Romania, peaking atop the latter country's national chart.

The accompanying music video for "Wait a Minute" was directed by Marc Webb, showing the Pussycat Dolls performing dance routines on a subway car and in the city streets. It was nominated for a MuchMusic Video Award and a MOBO Award. The song was performed on multiple occasions, including the group's PCD World Tour (2006–2007) and Doll Domination Tour (2009).

Background and development 
In April 2005, the Pussycat Dolls released their debut single "Don't Cha", which became an international hit and stands as group's most successful single. The success of "Don't Cha" prompted PCDs executive producer Ron Fair to rush-record the album, enlisting various producers, including Timbaland. Through her connections with Timbaland, singer-songwriter Keri Hilson was also enlisted to write songs for the Pussycat Dolls. Their collaboration resulted in "Physical" and "Wait a Minute", both of which were slated to be included on PCD; however, only the latter was included on the album. "Physical" was later intended to be included on Her Name Is Nicole, the shelved solo album by the group's lead singer Nicole Scherzinger.

Music and lyrics
"Wait a Minute" was written and produced by Timbaland, with additional writing by Hilson and Craig Longmiles. Longmiles' contribution was not noted on the physical copies of PCD, but was credited on digital editions of the album. The song is composed in  time in the key of B minor, with a moderate hip-hop groove of 144 beats per minute and a looping chord progression of Bm–D–Bm–D–Bm, while using "sassy handclaps". The artists' vocal range spans from A3 to F5, with the harmonies being described as "close-clustered and tightly executed".

In their duet, the Pussycat Dolls and Timbaland have a humorous give and take, highlighting the differences between the two sexes. Timbaland, who was noted for his awkward flirting, fails to impress Scherzinger. Hilson handled the vocal production as well, while Fair provided incidental production. The artists' vocals were recorded at The Hit Factory Criteria in Miami by Marcella Araica and Demacio "Demo" Castellon. The song was mixed by Dave Pensado and Fair.

Critical reception 
"Wait a Minute" received generally positive reviews from music critics. In his consumer guide for MSN Music, Robert Christgau selected  "Wait a Minute" as one of the highlights of its parent album PCD.
Writing for the Tampa Bay Times, Sean Daly acknowledged "Wait a Minute" as PCDs best song, feeling it was "perfect for the dance floor". Stephen Thomas Erlewine of AllMusic indicated the song as one of the standout tracks of the album. Similarly, Nick Butler from Sputnikmusic deemed the song "another highlight track". Lisa Haines of the BBC wrote the song is "perfect for singing along to with a handy hairbrush". Popjustice found "Wait a Minute" to be better than the previous single releases of the album.

Curt Fields of The Washington Post complimented Timbaland as a producer for "his quirky percussive touch and stuttering beats" and described the song as a "prime example" of a "[song] that had [listeners] turning up the volume". Casey Dolan of the Los Angeles Times complimented the frivolous nature of the song and distinguished the vocal performance as "the outstanding feature of the track". On the contrary, Andrew Mueller of The Guardian opined "Wait a Minute" was a "tiresome, painfully contrived irritant" that "becomes more oppressively depressing than any war or famine presently in progress". He went on to compare its lyrics to a "daytime talk show dialogue".

 Commercial performance 
"Wait a Minute" debuted at number 77 on the US Billboard Hot 100 on the issue dated November 25, 2006. The song went on to peak at number 28 on January 13, 2007, and spent a total of 17 weeks on the chart. Additionally, "Wait a Minute" appeared on mainstream radio charts in North America, peaking at numbers 19 and 23 on Canada CHR/Top 40 and the US Mainstream Top 40, respectively.

In Oceania, the song debuted and peaked at number 16 on the ARIA Top 100 Singles Chart in Australia and at number 24 on the New Zealand Singles Chart, becoming the first single from PCD not to enter the top ten; in New Zealand, it became their lowest-charting song.

Across Europe, "Wait a Minute" performed better in several countries. In Romania, the song became the Pussycat Dolls' second number-one on the Romanian Top 100. In Finland, it achieved the group's highest peak, at number three, until "Jai Ho! (You Are My Destiny)" peaked at the summit in 2009. The song peaked within the top 20 in Belgium (Flanders) and the Netherlands, and top 50 in Austria, Denmark, Germany, Switzerland, and Sweden, becoming the group's lowest-charting single in multiple countries. In the United Kingdom, the song failed to enter the top 100 of the UK Singles Chart, peaking at number 108, as it never received an official release there.

 Music video 
Directed by Marc Webb, the accompanying music video for "Wait a Minute" was filmed during the week of October 13, 2006. Throughout the video, the Pussycat Dolls perform choreography on a subway car and on city streets.

The video received nominations for Best International Group Video at the 2007 MuchMusic Video Awards and Best Video at the 2007 MOBO Awards.

Live performances
On December 7, 2005, the Pussycat Dolls performed at the annual KIIS-FM Jingle Ball at the Shrine Auditorium in Los Angeles, with some members wearing "festive candy-cane-striped belly shirts and red-and-green capri pants". They performed four songs, including "Wait a Minute". Timbaland joined the group at the MTV Goes Gold: New Year's Eve 2007 special to perform "Wait a Minute".

The group also performed the song during their PCD World Tour (2006–2007), Christina Aguilera's Back to Basics Tour (2007), and their Doll Domination Tour (2009).

Track listings and formatsAustralian and German CD single"Wait a Minute" (album version) 3:42
"Wait a Minute" (Timbaland version) 3:56German maxi CD single"Wait a Minute" (album version) 3:42
"Wait a Minute" (Timbaland version) 3:56
"Wait a Minute" (Timbaland instrumental) 3:04
"Wait a Minute" (music video)US promotional 12-inch vinyl"Wait a Minute" (album version clean) 3:42
"Wait a Minute" (alternative clean mix) 3:56
"Wait a Minute" (instrumental) 4:11
"Wait a Minute" (alternative dirty mix) 4:11
"Wait a Minute" (a capella) 2:35

 Credits and personnel 
Credits adapted from the liner notes of PCD and Tidal.RecordingRecorded at The Hit Factory Criteria (Miami, Florida)Personnel'

Marcella Araica recording
Demacio "Demo" Castellon recording
Ariel Chobaz assistant mix engineer
Ron Fair incidental producer, mix engineer
Gary Grant horns
Jerry Hey horn arrangement, horns
Tal Herzberg engineer, Pro Tools
Dan Higgins horns
Keri Hilson songwriter, vocal producer
Craig Longmiles songwriter 
Timothy "Timbaland" Mosley featured artist, songwriter, producer
Dave "Hard Drive" Pensado mix engineer
Bill Reichenbach horns

Charts

Weekly charts

Year-end charts

Certifications

Release history

See also
List of Romanian Top 100 number ones of the 2000s

References

External links
 
 Official website

2005 songs
2006 singles
The Pussycat Dolls songs
Timbaland songs
Song recordings produced by Timbaland
Songs written by Keri Hilson
Music videos directed by Marc Webb
Number-one singles in Romania
A&M Records singles
Interscope Records singles